Shriya Pilgaonkar is an Indian actress, director, producer, writer and stage performer. She is the daughter of actors Sachin and Supriya Pilgaonkar.

Early life 
Shriya is the only child of famed Marathi actors Sachin and Supriya Pilgaonkar. As a child, Pilgaonkar trained to become a professional swimmer and won several medals while in school. Believing that she might become a translator or a linguist when she grew up, Pilgaonkar also took classes in Japanese when she was a child. Later deciding to take a different route, Pilgaonkar completed her bachelor's degree in Sociology at St. Xavier's College in Mumbai. Pilgaonkar also learned Kathak as a child.

Career

Acting
At the age of five, Pilgaonkar first appeared on television in the Hindi serial Tu Tu Main Main, playing a boy named Bittu. Pilgaonkar made her stage debut in 2012 with her performance in Karan Shetty's 10-minute short play Freedom Of Love. The play was a part of the NCPA's Short and Sweet Festival. In the play, she acted, sang, and danced.

After her performance in Freedom of Love, Pilgaonkar made her big screen debut with the 2013 Marathi film Ekulti Ek. In the film, she plays the role of Swara, the daughter of Arun Deshpande (Sachin Pilgaonakar) and Nandini (Supriya Pilgaonkar). She was offered the role of Swara by her father (Sachin Pilgaonkar) who wrote, directed, and produced the film. Pilgaonkar said, "He has been credited for launching many a talent, including my mother. When he offered me the film, I didn't want a favour. But he corrected me, saying, 'I am not stupid to invest resources without reason'." She also added, "Experience-wise I am a beginner but I think it's a wonderful time to be in the industry. There is so much happening, so much changing. I feel proud that I am doing my first film with my father." This movie debut led her to win six awards. Among them was the Maharashtra State Government Award for Best Debut Actress, which she received at the 51st Maharashtra State Film Awards. The film received average to positive reviews from critics. A critic of The Times of India gave the film 3/5 stars, stating "It's the perfect launch for his (Sachin Pilgaonkar) daughter Shriya into films and she does not disappoint."

Following her role in Ekulti Ek, Pilgaonkar participated in other stage and film projects. She was approached by theatre veteran actor Akarsh Khurana to star in Internal Affairs and Common People. After appearing in both, she received an opportunity to work in the French film Un plus une, helmed by Oscar-winning director Claude Lelouch. In the film, she played the role of Ayanna, an Indian dancer, and actor.

Pilgaonkar made her Bollywood debut in the 2016 film Fan, written and directed by Maneesh Sharma and produced by Aditya Chopra through Yash Raj Films. Pilgaonkar was selected for her role from the audition of 750 girls conducted by Maneesh Sharma, and she considered getting a role alongside Shah Rukh Khan a big breakthrough. In the film, she plays the role of Neha, a Delhi-based call center girl, and Gaurav's friend. She was shooting for both the films Fan and Un plus une at the same time. After the release of Fan, Pilgaonkar was overwhelmed by the response. Of the reception of the film, she said, "Honestly, I did not want to have any expectation because it was a small role and we had two Shah Rukhs in the film but I am so happy that everyone took notice and has acknowledged my performance."

In 2018, Shriya played the role of Sweety Gupta in the Amazon Prime India show Mirzapur. The show was a massive success, and Shriya soon became a popular face among the masses. Shriya later confirmed that her character wouldn't be returning after the first season. In 2020, she appeared on two Voot shows: The Gone Game and Crackdown.

Director and producer
In addition to being an actress, Pilgaonkar is also a director and a producer of short films. In 2012, she went to Harvard University for summer school, which led her to work on her own short films. In an interview with Mumbai Mirror, she said, "Once I felt confident, I directed Painted Signal, a short film, and Panchgavya", a documentary which she co-directed with Hana Kitasei. It examines the plight of cows as they wander around Bikaner in Rajasthan.  She also co-directed and edited the short film Dresswala with Siddharth Joglekar, which was an official selection at the 2012 Mumbai Film Festival. Both Painted Signal and Dresswala received average responses from critics and were screened at international film festivals.

In the media 
Pilgaonkar made her place in The Times Of India's Most Desirable Women List and was ranked at No. 40 in 2020.

Pilgaonkar has modeled and is also known in the advertisement world. She has worked with celebrities such as Shahid Kapoor and Vikrant Massey, in advertisements.

Filmography

Films

Web series

Television

Plays
All plays are in English unless otherwise noted.

As director and producer

Awards and nominations

See also 

 Pankaj Tripathi
 Ali Fazal
 Divyenndu
 Mirzapur
 List of bollywood actresses
 List of Indian film actors

References

External links
 
 
 

Living people
Actresses in Marathi cinema
Actresses in Hindi cinema
Indian film actresses
Indian television actresses
Actresses from Mumbai
Marathi people
Film directors from Mumbai
Indian women film directors
Indian stage actresses
Actresses in Hindi television
20th-century Indian actresses
Indian women film producers
Film producers from Mumbai
21st-century Indian actresses
Businesswomen from Maharashtra
Year of birth missing (living people)